Jonah Ananias Paul Ayunga (born 24 May 1997) is an English born Kenyan professional footballer who plays as a winger for St. Mirren.

Club career

Early career
Ayunga started his career at Bridport Youth in 2007 and was in the squad for the Dorset County under-16s representative team.

In July 2015, Ayunga went on a trial at Dorchester Town and impressed the side in the pre-season. As a result, Ayunga was signed by Dorchester Town, signing a 12-month contract on 19 July 2015. He made his Dorchester Town debut in the opening game of the season, scoring in a 3–0 win over Histon, followed up by scoring in a 4–2 win over Cirencester Town. By the time of his departure, Ayunga made 31 appearances, scoring seven times during his spell at the club. Dorchester manager, Mark Jermyn described him as "an exciting young talent" and a "strong and powerful center forward".

Brighton & Hove Albion
It was agreed that Ayunga agreed a move to Brighton & Hove Albion on 31 January 2016. The move was confirmed on 1 February 2016 for £40,000, with the transfer fee being touted as "the biggest receipt in the history of Dorchester Town FC".

He made his debut in a 4–1 friendly defeat to Arsenal U21, his coach at Brighton described him as a "good player and natural goal scorer". It wasn't until on 11 April 2016 when he scored his first Brighton & Hove Albion U23, in a 4–1 win over Newcastle United U23.

In the summer pre-season tour of 2016, Ayunga played against his former club, Dorchester Town, which saw Brighton & Hove Albion U21 won 7–0 in July 2016.

On 24 October 2016, Jonah was sent on a month long loan to English 7th tier side Burgess Hill Town, he scored his first goal at Burgess in a 5-1 thumping of Beaconsfield SYCOB After making 10 appearances, Ayunga's loan spell at Burgess Hill Town came to an end.

On 23 January 2017, Ayunga joined Irish side Sligo Rovers on loan for the 2017 campaign. He made his Sligo Rovers debut in the opening game of the season, in a 5–1 loss against Limerick. However, in a follow up match against Dundalk on 4 March 2017, he was sent-off for a second bookable offence, in a 4–0 loss. After returning from suspension, Ayunga then scored his first goal for the club, in a 2–0 win over Bohemians on 8 April 2017. He went on to score two more goals against Drogheda United and Limerick. He went on to make 22 appearances and scoring 4 times in all competitions before his loan has terminated on the 31 July 2017.

On 31 July 2017, Ayunga joined Irish side Galway United on loan for the remainder of the 2017 campaign. He made his Galway United debut on 4 August 2017, in a 2–1 win over Finn Harps., Ayunga's loan with Galway United was cut short after just four games through injury.

Sutton United
Ayunga signed for Sutton United in the summer of 2018, following his release by Brighton. On 4 September 2018, he made his debut during a 1–0 victory over Maidstone United, featuring for 65 minutes before being replaced by Tommy Wright. Just under a month later, he scored his first goal for the club, clinching a 48th-minute winner against promotion hopefuls, Leyton Orient.

On 24 November 2018, Ayunga made the switch to fellow National League side, Havant & Waterlooville on a three-month loan. On the same day, Ayunga went onto net on his debut during a 5–2 victory over Maidstone United, netting Havant's second in the 35th minute. Three days later, he continued his good form, netting a late consolation goal in Havant's 3–1 defeat against Dagenham & Redbridge.

Following his impressive form, Ayunga returned to Sutton prematurely and went onto feature seventeen more times, scoring twice before leaving at the end of the campaign.

Havant & Waterlooville
On 14 May 2019, Ayunga agreed to return to Havant, following their relegation to the National League South. Before the early conclusion of the season, Ayunga had scored seventeen goals in the league, seeing him win the Golden Boot award in a three-way tie along with McQueen of Dartford and Iaciofano of St Albans City. The season ultimately ended in disappointment for Ayunga and Havant as they were defeated 2–1 in the play off semi-final by Dartford after Ayunga had given his side the lead.

Bristol Rovers
On 29 July 2020, Ayunga signed for League One side Bristol Rovers for an undisclosed fee, signing a two-year deal.

He made his debut for the club on 5 September 2020, in a 3–0 League Cup defeat to Ipswich Town, replacing Cameron Hargreaves from the bench at half time. He made his first start for the club the following Tuesday in a 2–2 draw against Walsall in the EFL Trophy, a game in which Ayunga also scored his first goal for the club to level the score. On 16 February 2021, Ayunga scored his first league goals for the club in just his second league start, scoring a brace as the Gas defeated Portsmouth to help in their fight against relegation.

Morecambe
On 26 July 2021, Ayunga returned to League One following Bristol Rovers' relegation to join newly promoted Morecambe for an undisclosed fee, signing a two-year contract. After surviving relegation in their first season, Ayunga was transfer-listed at the end of the 2021–22 season.

International career
Ayunga received his first call up to the Kenya national team on 5 August 2016, but never played.

Personal life
Ayunga has a younger brother, Solomon, who's also a footballer and they both attended Beaminster school. While at Beaminster school, Ayunga was also in the school's bobsleigh team.

Career statistics

References

1997 births
Living people
People from Beaminster
Footballers from Dorset
English people of Kenyan descent
Kenyan footballers
English footballers
Association football forwards
Bridport F.C. players
Dorchester Town F.C. players
Brighton & Hove Albion F.C. players
Burgess Hill Town F.C. players
Sligo Rovers F.C. players
Galway United F.C. players
Poole Town F.C. players
Sutton United F.C. players
Havant & Waterlooville F.C. players
Bristol Rovers F.C. players
Morecambe F.C. players
Southern Football League players
Isthmian League players
League of Ireland players
National League (English football) players
English Football League players#
Kenyan expatriate footballers
St Mirren F.C. players
Scottish Professional Football League players